Jitendra Kumar Maheshwari (born 29 June 1961) is a judge of the Supreme Court of India. He is former chief justice of the Sikkim High Court. Before that, he served as chief justice of the Andhra Pradesh High Court and judge of Madhya Pradesh High Court. He was born in Joura, Madhya Pradesh. He was a practicing lawyer in Gwalior before he got elevated to the bench.

References

1961 births
Living people
21st-century Indian judges
Chief Justices of the Andhra Pradesh High Court
Justices of the Supreme Court of India
People from Morena district